La Puebla de Valverde is a municipality located in the province of Teruel, Aragon, Spain. According to the 2004 census (INE), the municipality had a population of 508 inhabitants.

This town is located at the feet of the Sierra de Camarena, Sistema Ibérico.

See also
Escandón Pass

References

External links
La Puebla de Valverde on Diputación de Teruel

Municipalities in the Province of Teruel